The following is a list of characters for Bandai's arcade game and anime franchise, Aikatsu!.

Main characters

Starlight Academy

First generation

 (speaking voice), Waka from STAR☆ANIS (singing voice)
The cheerful, hard-working protagonist of the anime storyline for the first two seasons. She's a first year student in Starlight Academy's junior high branch, and later moves up to second year in Episode 26, and third year in Episode 51. In Episode 74, she graduates from Starlight Academy's junior high branch, and enters the high school branch in Episode 76. Ichigo's original dream was to inherit Nandemo Bento. One day, a concert of top idol Mizuki Kanzaki left a big impression on her, and with her mother's encouragement, Ichigo began to follow her own dreams of being an idol. 

A cute idol, Ichigo's theme color is pink and her favorite brand is Angely Sugar.

She is a member of the idol unit Soleil, alongside Aoi and Ran. She was also a member of the temporary idol units STAR☆ANIS, Dream Star, and Aikatsu8.

Ichigo becomes a top idol in the Movie, following the success of her solo live, the Great Ichigo Starmiya Festival. She manages to pass Mizuki in the Aikatsu Ranking, placing 1st while Mizuki is moved down to 2nd. In Episode 125, she temporarily leaves Starlight Academy with Aoi and Ran for their nationwide "Soleil tour - Our Dream".

 (speaking voice), Fūri from STAR☆ANIS (singing voice)
Aoi is Ichigo's best friend who knows a lot about idols, to the point where she's known as the "Idol Professor". They've known each other since childhood and attended the same local junior high school before they entered Starlight Academy and shared the same dormitory room. Her catchphrase is "Odayaka ja nai wa ne.", which has multiple plausible translations. 

A cool idol, Aoi's theme color is blue and her favorite brand is Futuring Girl.

She is a member of the idol unit Soleil, alongside Ichigo and Ran.

In Episode 125, she temporarily leaves Starlight Academy with Ran and Ichigo for their nationwide "Soleil tour - Our Dream".

 (speaking voice), Sunao Yoshikawa (former singing voice), Yuna from STAR☆ANIS (current singing voice)

Ran is Ichigo and Aoi's classmate. She has secretly been keeping a close eye on Ichigo and Aoi, believing that they won't be able to be friends forever and will one day go against each other. She became a bit of a loner after her friend and former roommate Mako dropped out of Starlight Academy, but soon became close friends with Ichigo and Aoi. She is nicknamed . 

A sexy idol, her theme color is purple and her favorite brand is Spicy Ageha.

Ran was initially a member of the unit, Tristar, but was dropped out by Mizuki after seeing how unhappy Ran was being apart from Ichigo and Aoi. Soon after, Ran became a member of Ichigo and Aoi's unit, Soleil. She was also a member of the temporary idol units STAR☆ANIS and Dream Star.

In Episode 125, she temporarily leaves Starlight Academy with Ichigo and Aoi for their nationwide "Soleil tour - Our Dream".

 (speaking voice), Remi from STAR☆ANIS (singing voice)
Debuted in the second wave of the arcade game and Episode 10 of the anime. Otome is a bubbly girl who is in the same grade as Ichigo, but in a different class. She is best known for her catchphrase, "Love You!". It's shown Otome is a hard-working person despite her frivolous nature, and practices for jobs at least a year beforehand. 

A pop idol, her theme color is yellow and her favorite brand is Happy Rainbow. After Mizuki leaves Starlight Academy, Otome became the new Starlight Queen.

After Tristar and Soleil are formed, Otome impulsively starts her own unit, Powapowa Puririn, alongside Sakura and Shion in Episode 38. Following Tristar's disbandment and Soleil's temporary hiatus, Powapowa Puririn became one of the most popular idol units of their time. Otome was also a member of the temporary idol units STAR☆ANIS, Dream Star and Aikatsu8.

 (speaking voice), Moe Yamazaki (former singing voice), Remi from STAR☆ANIS (current singing voice)

Debuted in the third wave of the arcade game and Episode 19 of the anime. Yurika is Otome's classmate, and a self-proclaimed "600-year-old dhampir" who constantly acts in character, generally walking around with a parasol to shield herself from sunlight. Outside of the public eye, however, she is a quiet girl who is addicted to vampire romance manga. Contradictory to her character, Yurika's favorite food is garlic ramen. 

A cool idol, her theme color is viridian and her favorite brand is LoLi GoThiC.

In Episode 38, Yurika became Tristar's third member, replacing Ran. After Mizuki left Starlight Academy, Tristar was disbanded, but in Episode 79, Kaede and Yurika decided to continue being unit partners, their unit was later named マジックブラッド (Magic Blood) in the mobile game Aikatsu Photo On Stage. Yurika was also a member of the temporary idol units STAR☆ANIS and Aikatsu8.

 (speaking voice), Eri from STAR☆ANIS (singing voice)
Debuted in the fourth wave of the arcade game and Episode 26 of the anime. Sakura is a grade under Ichigo and the others, and like her, was inspired by Mizuki to become an idol. She has a close relationship with her brother Sakon. Sakura comes from a famous kabuki troupe family "", and as such, she has a habit of breaking into theatrical performance when reminiscing about things. She has learned and trained in ancient Japanese arts, and is a very talented ballerina.

A cute idol, her theme color is bright green (called lime in the anime) and her favorite brand is Aurora Fantasy. 

In Episode 124, Sakura becomes the new Starlight Queen after Otome.

Sakura is a member of the idol unit, Powapowa Puririn, alongside Otome and Shion. Sakura was also a member of the temporary idol unit STAR☆ANIS.

 (speaking voice), Yuna from STAR☆ANIS (singing voice)
Debuted in the fifth wave of the arcade game and Episode 33 of the anime. She transfers into Starlight Academy in hopes of becoming part of Mizuki's idol unit, Tristar. She is in the same year as Ichigo and the others, and is from America, where she has appeared in many commercials for her father's sushi chain, "Kaede Sushi". She uses a lot of English phrases and has a habit of kissing people on the cheek when they first meet. Kaede also has a fascination with magic and enjoys performing tricks. She practices tap dance in her spare time.

A pop idol, her theme color is orange and her favorite brand is Magical Toy.

Kaede was a member of the idol unit, Tristar, before its disbandment. She is currently in Magic Blood with Yurika. Kaede was also a member of the temporary idol unit STAR☆ANIS.

Second generation

 (speaking voice), Ruka from STAR☆ANIS/AIKATSU☆STARS! (singing voice)
Debuted in the fourth wave of the arcade game's 2014 series and Episode 76 of the anime. Three years under Ichigo, Akari is a clumsy, nervous, but resilient girl who highly admires Ichigo. Akari auditions into Starlight Academy, and makes multiple mistakes during her performance, but manages to receive a passing mark from Ichigo, allowing her to enroll in the school. Initially, her hairstyle is nearly identical to Ichigo's, but soon she cuts it after her realization that she needs to create her own story.

A cute idol, Akari's theme color is coral pink, and her favorite brand is Dreamy Crown. She is a member of duo unit with Madoka, Skips, as well as a member of the three-person unit, Luminas.

In Episode 177, she becomes the new Starlight Queen.

Akari is capable of performing a Romance Appeal and Fever Appeal and currently has five Premium Rare dresses.

 (speaking voice), Mona Tomoyama (former singing voice), Rie from AIKATSU☆STARS! (current singing voice)

Akari's new roommate since the second semester. She is described as a cool beauty who loves fortune-telling. In Episode 102, it is revealed that her older sister convinced her to enroll into Starlight Academy not only because of her passion for singing but as a way to make new friends. However, before meeting Akari, Sumire viewed the idol world as one where everyone only existed as rivals. Sumire is a member of the duo unit with Rin, Dancing Diva, occasionally shortened as DanDiva. She is also a member of the three-person unit, Luminas.

In Episode 117, Sumire is set to record a debut single (Tarte・Tatin), which is later released in the following episode. 

A cool idol, Sumire's theme color is periwinkle and her favorite brand is LoLi GoThiC, like Yurika.

She is capable of performing a Romance Appeal (being the first idol in the series to do so) and Fever Appeal and currently has three Premium Rare dresses.

 (speaking voice), Miki from AIKATSU☆STARS! (singing voice)

She is described as a fashionable girl who knows a lot about Aikatsu! cards. She is in the same class as Sumire and is rather fond of Akari. Hinaki has very informal mannerisms that make her easy to get along with, and refers to herself as "Hina". In Episode 103, it is revealed that she started off her career as a young television actress, with her specialty being gourmet reports. In Episode 113, Hinaki reveals that three years prior to the beginning of Season 3, she had met with top designer Kayoko and asked her for a Premium dress, but was rejected as back then, Hinaki lacked her own fashion sense, but has since then developed a high affinity for clothing to the point where she can modify outfits to make them more aesthetically pleasing. She's a member of duo unit with Juri, and a member of the three-person unit, Luminas.

A pop idol, Hinaki's theme color is chartreuse and her favorite brand is Vivid Kiss, like Mikuru.

Hinaki is capable of performing a Romance Appeal and Fever Appeal and currently has four Premium Rare dresses.

 (speaking voice), Miho from AIKATSU☆STARS! (singing voice)

Debuted in the second wave of the arcade game's 2015 series. Juri is described as an idol who's stirring up a passionate wind at the academy in her quest to become a great actress, and she is also a talented flamenco dancer. She is the daughter of famous actress Karen Kurebayashi and a well-known Spanish chef Serio Kamino, is childhood friends with Hinaki, and classmates with Akari. Juri would often take jobs when she was younger, but temporarily stopped taking offers when she realized she needed to become an actress through her own hard work rather than riding on her mother's coattails. She is a member of Passionate✮Jalapeño (情熱✮ハラペーニョ Jōnetsu Harapēnyo), a duo unit with Hinaki. She is also a member of the three-person unit, Vanilla Chili Pepper.

A sexy idol, Juri's theme color is crimson and her favorite brand is Sangria Rosa.

Juri is capable of performing a Romance Appeal and currently has two Premium Rare dresses.

 (speaking voice), Nanase from AIKATSU☆STARS! (singing voice)
Debuted in the fourth wave of the arcade game's 2015 series and in cartoon Episode 126. Rin is a new student one year under Akari. Prior to becoming an idol, Rin was a street performer, where her talent led Rin to become known as the "Dancing Lightning".

A cool idol, Rin's theme color is navy and her favorite brand is Dance Fusion. She is a member of duo unit with Sumire, Dancing Diva and a member of the three-person unit, Vanilla Chili Pepper.

Rin currently has two Premium Rare dresses.

 (speaking voice), Kana from AIKATSU☆STARS! (singing voice)

Debuted in the fourth wave of the arcade game's 2015 series. Madoka is Rin's both classmate and roommate, known for her soft smile. Though not having any idol experience before, she is the granddaughter of Angely Sugar's top designer Asuka Amahane. She is a member of duo unit with Akari, Skips, and a member of the three-person unit Vanilla Chili Pepper.

A cute idol, Madoka's theme color is pastel blue and her favorite brand is Angely Sugar.

Madoka currently has one Premium Rare dress - the Angel Alice Coord (Episode 133).

 (speaking voice), Miho from AIKATSU☆STARS! (singing voice)

Scheduled debut in the first wave of the arcade game's 2016 series. A Hokkaido idol who has been singing in public since childhood. Nono is an opposite to Risa - active, immature (considered as childish in some aspects). She usually doesn't think before saying something. Nono is a great admirer of "Luminas" and overjoys when it comes face to face with any idol. However, she's very encouraging. Nono has faith in those she trusts and cares for. Referred as "Nonocchi" (ののっち Nonocchi) by Risa's family, Akari, Madoka and Johnny.

A sexy idol, her theme color is hot pink and her favourite brand is Dolly Devil.

Nono currently has two Premium Rare Dresses.

 (speaking voice), Nanase from AIKATSU☆STARS! (singing voice)
Scheduled debut in the first wave of the arcade game's 2016 series. Nono's partner who knows her the best. Lisa is calm and mature, unlike Nono; however she also quickly becomes embarrassed, when something is mentioned to people who she met that could otherwise be childish or trivial in her eyes. Lisa is also very level-headed, rational and she feels good in her skin. She can be passionate about things that lit up the fire in her life - as shown with Aikatsu. Also, referred as "Risappe" (リサっぺ Risappe) by Nono's family, Akari, Madoka and Johnny.

A sexy idol, her theme color is lavender and her favourite brand is Dolly Devil. 
She currently has two Premium Rare Dresses.

 (speaking voice), Fūri from STAR☆ANIS (singing voice)
Debuted in the first wave of the arcade game's 2014 series and Episode 51 of the anime. A newly-enrolled student of Dream Academy in the same year with Ichigo. She has much experience with musical instruments and has absolute pitch, and her family runs a cafeteria known as Cafe Vivo. A cool idol, Seira's theme color is red-violet (called rouge in the anime), and her favorite brand is Swing ROCK. 

In Episode 94, Seira performs with Ichigo in an Idol Unit called 2wingS.

Seira was a member of the temporary idol units Dream Star and Aikatsu8. Seira is capable of performing a Constellation Appeal, and was in fact, the first idol ever to do so. She currently has two Premium Rare dresses.

 (speaking voice), Yuna from STAR☆ANIS (singing voice)
Debuted in the first wave of the arcade game's 2014 series and Episode 51 of the anime. She's in the same year as Seira and is Seira's executive producer, being a student of Dream Academy's producer course. However, with Seira's support, Ki debuts as an idol in Episode 55. 

A pop idol, her theme color is lime green and her favorite brand is Magical Toy, like Kaede.

Ki was a member of the temporary idol unit Dream Star. Kii is capable of performing a Constellation Appeal, and currently has one Premium Rare dress.

 (speaking voice), Sunao Yoshikawa (former singing voice), Eri from STAR☆ANIS (current singing voice)

Debuted in the second wave of the arcade game's 2014 series and Episode 61 of the anime. Sora is in the same grade as Seira, and is a student of Dream Academy's idol and designer course. Under the recommendation of Yumesaki Tiara, Sora created her own brand, Bohemian Sky. A sexy idol, her theme colors are cyan and indigo (called sky in the anime).

Sora was a member of the temporary idol units Dream Star and Aikatsu8. Sora is capable of performing a Constellation Appeal, and currently has one Premium Rare dress.

 (speaking voice), Eri from STAR☆ANIS (singing voice)

Debuted in the third wave of the arcade game's 2014 series and Episode 68 of the anime. Maria is a model in the same grade as Seira and good friends with Sora. She comes from a wealthy family that owns a farm in the mountains. A cute idol, Maria's theme color is apricot and her favorite brand is Aurora Fantasy. Due to her family owning a farm, she owns multiple cows, but is especially close to one named Elizabeth III.

Maria was a member of the temporary idol units Dream Star and Aikatsu8. Maria is capable of performing a Constellation Appeal and currently has one Premium Rare dress.

Other main characters

 (speaking voice), Risuko from STAR☆ANIS (singing voice)
Originally a top idol and Starlight Queen from Starlight Academy, year above Ichigo. She started off as a model then mysteriously disappeared from the public for a whole year and came back as a Starlight Academy student. During that time, she did extensive training by a special coach, later revealed to be Johnny Bepp, a teacher at Starlight. Mizuki doesn't show her hard-working side to others, and is thought of as a prodigy. She is highly idolized by Ichigo and inspired her to enroll into Starlight Academy.

In Episode 50, she left Starlight Academy to pursue her dream of producing idols instead of moving on to the high school branch. It is revealed in season two that Mizuki is the reason of Dream Academy's sudden success, having thought of Dream Academy's training methods using technology.

A sexy idol, her theme color is magenta (called red in the anime). Mizuki's preferred brand was initially Love Queen, later renamed as Love Moonrise, which was made exclusively for her.

Mizuki was the leader of the idol unit Tristar. After she left Starlight Academy, Tristar was disbanded. Mizuki then started a partnership with Mikuru Natsuki, debuting as the unit WM (pronounced Double M). She was also a member of the temporary idol units STAR☆ANIS and Aikatsu8. Mizuki is capable of performing a Constellation Appeal and currently has three Premium Rare dresses.

 (speaking voice), Mona Tomoyama (former singing voice), Fūri from STAR☆ANIS (current singing voice)
A sweet, well-meaning gardener who first met Mizuki while Mizuki was still a Starlight Academy student. Mizuki was unable to choose a Coord for her concert, but was helped by Mikuru, who advised her to wear a Coord that showed her fans a side of her that they haven't seen before.

After Mizuki left Starlight and Dream Academy, she found Mikuru and started up a partnership with her, debuting as the unit WM. Mizuki states that while Mikuru is not an idol, there's a lot that she has to offer because of that. Mikuru is also very hard-working, and often trains without Mizuki during the night, as she only became an idol as of recently. 

A pop idol, Mikuru's theme color is Vivid Pink and her favorite brand is Vivid Kiss. Mikuru is currently abroad in preparation for the Gardeners World Cup, thus resulting in a temporary disbandment of WM.

Mikuru was also a member of the temporary idol unit Aikatsu8. Mikuru is capable of performing a Constellation Appeal, and currently has one Premium Rare dress.

 (speaking voice), Remi from STAR☆ANIS (singing voice)

Debuted in the third wave of the arcade game's 2015 series.

Miyabi believes that because of her "stiff" nature, she isn't fit to be an idol, but Akari convinces her that this is what makes her one-of-a-kind. Miyabi also develops a friendship with Sakura, both having come from traditional Japanese families, as well as their similar backstories concerning their entrance into the idol world.She returns to Himezakura Girl's Academy in Episode 121. She is a member of duo unit with Kokone Sweet & Soft☆Nadeshiko (あまふわ☆なでしこ Amafuwa☆Nadeshiko).

She currently has one Premium Rare dress.

 (speaking voice), Eri from STAR☆ANIS (singing voice)
Debuted in the fifth wave of the arcade game's 2015 series, Kokone is a student of Kobe school Étoile Academy and a local idol. In Episode 135, she becomes an exchange student to Starlight Academy. She returns to Etoilé Academy in Episode 142. She is a member of duo unit with Miyabi Sweet & Soft☆Nadeshiko (あまふわ☆なでしこ Amafuwa☆Nadeshiko).

A pop type idol, Kokone's theme color is lime & her favored brand is Retro Clover.

She currently has one Premium Rare dress.

 (speaking voice), Kana from AIKATSU☆STARS! (singing voice)
Debuted in the second wave of the arcade game's 2016 series, Nina is a student of Naniwa World's No.1 Academy in Osaka. She also pursues a career in comedy alongside her idol activities.

She currently has one Premium Rare dress.

Supporting characters

Orihime Mitsuishi is the headmistress of Starlight Academy. Years ago, she was a national-level idol as a member of the legendary idol unit, Masquerade, under the stage name Hime, but she suddenly disbanded in order to succeed her father's career as a zaibatsu president and principal. 

, 

Starlight Academy's dance teacher and choreographer and Ichigo's homeroom teacher. He is quite lively, often believing life to be a 'showtime', and constantly uses English phrases. He is later revealed to be Mizuki's special coach.

Starlight Academy's janitor, who often gives words of advice to Ichigo and the others. Outside of the school, he is secretly the vocalist of an up and coming rock band More Than True.

 (speaking voice), Yuna from STAR☆ANIS (singing voice)
Debuted on Episode 14 of the anime and participated on the arcade game's third wave campaign. She is a popular drama actress titled "" for her cool, levelheaded personality that can easily change while acting. She ends up being dragged into Otome's PowaPowa Puririn group, but chooses not to join STAR☆ANIS in order to focus on her acting career. She is a Cool type idol whose theme color is green and her preferred brand is Futuring Girl.

Mizuki's manager, who knows all of Mizuki's secrets, as Mizuki trusts her completely. Even if she seems dark, quiet and strict, Honoka cares for Mizuki and does her job very carefully.

Hiro is the lead-guitarist in More Than True. He is also a good friend of Naoto.

The bassist of More Than True. He seems quiet, dark and strict, but overall he's kind and friendly and he even has a teasing side.

 
The drummer of More Than True, who rarely plays with other members on street. With his mohawk hairstyle and black clothing, he appears intimidating but is actually friendly.

 (speaking voice), Yuniko from STAR☆ANIS (singing voice)
Ran's rival who appears to skip classes for her Net Live in the school's underground, which makes her titled as "". She debuts on Episode 8 and had also participated on the arcade game's third wave campaign. On Episode 9 afterwards, she appears in minor to support Ran, Ichigo and Aoi. By October 2013, she is the official supporter for the shop of the series "Aikatsu! Official Shop". Her preferred brand is Spicy Ageha, and she is a Sexy type idol.

Tiara is a character that appears in season two of the Aikatsu! anime adaption. She is the headmistress of Dream Academy and is friends with Mizuki Kanzaki. She is the older sister of Naoto Suzukawa.

 (speaking voice)
Akari's classmate and previous roommate in the first semester. She was exchanged to Himezakura Academy from Episode 118 to 121 and to Étoile Academy from Episode 135 to 141 (except for the Unit Cup). Her favored brand is Swing ROCK.

 (speaking voice), Saori Codama (singing voice)
Kanon appears in the movie, as a bright, cheerful and king girl who writes songs and does street performances. She wrote the song Etude of Radiance for Ichigo for her Great StarMiya Ichigo Festival in the first Movie.

Shun is the new pastry chef at the cafeteria of the Starlight School & has introduced a bunch of brand new sugary snacks, including various homemade donuts. He used to be an idol in his youth under the stage name Yosshun. Kokone and her mother are big fans of him.

Miyabi's teacher in Himezakura Private Girls' Academy. He was the one that scouted Miyabi.

Top designers

Ichigo and Madoka's favorite brand, Angely Sugar's top designer. She is a mild-mannered middle-aged woman with glasses and Principal Orihime and Ringo's friend. She is Madoka's grandmother.

He is the gardener who lives with Asuka on Angely Mountain.

Futuring Girl's top designer, who has been admired by Aoi since she discovered Futuring Girl. He was mentioned by Aoi that he always watched her performances. He also seems to have a connection with Naoto and Tiara Suzukawa. In Episode 7, Naoto has the rare cards of the brand he gave to Aoi. In Episode 9, he showed with a female silhouette.

Ran's favorite brand, Spicy Ageha's top designer. She gave Ran premium rare cards in Episode 23 as Ran lost Spicy Ageha's representative audition.

Otome's favorite brand, Happy Rainbow's top designer. He is strict on time and known to be Green Grass' friend. In Episode 15, he won't give Otome his premium cards as she was late, but as he found a pair of his father's ring on Otome, he gives the premium card.

Yurika and Sumire's favorite brand, LoLi GoThiC's top designer. He lives in a spooky mansion and pretends that he was possessing the mansion for 300 years, he only wants his designs to be used only by strong person, who also can face the scandal like Yurika Tōdō. He also hires many staff to make courage temptation to their visitors, like Johnny Bepp.

 twins, top designers of Aurora Fantasy, Sakura and Maria's favorite brand who are in the past known for writing Sakura's favorite picture book "". Instead of replying Sakura's letters, they give her Aurora Fantasy's premium rare cards and hug her as she tries to visit them.

The top designer of Magical Toy, Kaede and Kii's favored brand. He is also a street clown who entertains people on the streets of New York.

Top designer of Swing ROCK, Seira's favored brand, and also a touring bassist. She admires Angely Sugar's top designer, Asuka Amahane.

KAYOKO

The top designer of ViVid Kiss, Mikuru & Hinaki's favored brand. She lives in LA.

Top designer of Dreamy Crown, Akari's favored brand. He was Asuka Amahane's helper at first. His dresses are often inspired by Akari's bright and cheerful personality. He has designed most of Akari's premium dresses. He is the youngest known designer, at the age of 16-17.

Top designer of Sangria Rosa, Juri's favored brand.

Sunny is the top designer of Dance Fusion, Rin's favored brand. He was a member of the dance unit Sunny & Johnny along with Johnny Bepp.

Top designer of Dolly Devil, Nono and Risa's favourite brand. She is characterized as a free spirit, going at her paca which makes trouble to her subordinates. A friendly, bright woman, who has a tendency to go for "Happening Hunts" - she wanders off in a middle of her work to search for situations that will spark her creativity.

Family members

Ichigo's mother, who runs a takeaway bento restaurant Nantemo Bento. She used to be worried that her own dream was influenced onto Ichigo and wanted her to do something else she wanted to do. When Raichi told her that Ichigo wanted to be an idol, Ringo knew that Ichigo thought she was in the way of Ichigo's dream and told Ichigo to do what she wanted to do. It is later revealed that she was once part of the legendary idol unit, Masquerade, under the stage name Miya. She disbanded in order to fulfill her second dream of making bento. Her aura is composed of cherry blossom flowers, similar to Ichigo's.

Ichigo's younger brother who is a huge fan of Mizuki, influencing Ichigo to become a fan herself. He adores the world of idols and has a huge crush on Aoi. In season three, he begins to attend the junior high school where Ichigo and Aoi attended three years ago.

Ichigo and Raichi's father, who is often traveling due to his business. He often gives seemingly wild tales about what goes on during his travels, but he has never once said a lie.

Sakura's older twin brother, who cares a lot for his sister, and at first does not approve her enrolling the Starlight Academy, but when sees how much Sakura had grown up, he supports her. He has a genetic habit of breaking into theatrical performance when experiencing strong emotions known as the "Kitaōji Theater". Like all the other males in the Kitaoji family, Sakon is also a Kabuki actor.

Seira and Noeru's mother, who runs Cafe Vivo.

Seira and Noeru's father, as well as Takako's husband who runs Cafe Vivo. He is very kind and caring to his family and friends.

Seira's younger sister and later became main protagonist of Aikatsu On Parade! Dream Story, who's in the same age with Raichi. She works at Vivo's cafe run by her parents. In elementary schoolhood, she belongs to a different class with Raichi, and both begin to share interests and news about their favorite idols. In season three, as a junior high student, she's enrolled in the same class with Raichi and another idol-fan classmate, Azuma Asahi. She's also a student of Dream Academy, like her sister.

Ki's mother. Sanae is a very kind woman and cares a lot for her daughter. She taught Ki her current catchphrase 'Ok-Ok-Okay!'. She is a doctor.

Akari's mother, she is very energetic, with a supportive personality, also a very caring mother.

Akari's father who is a geologist, very passionate about his job. He likes teasing Akari and is very cheerful. 

Sumire's older sister. She is very kind and protective towards her sister. She showed the Starlight Academy to Sumire and encouraged her to enroll. Her keen interest in LoLi GoThiC also deeply influences Sumire.

The mother of Juri Kurebayashi. She is a famous actress. People taught that Juri was a success because of her mother, so Juri started a career on her own. Still, Karen is a very supportive and kind mother and cares a lot for her daughter.

Karen Kurebayashi's husband and Juri's father. He is a well known Spanish chef. He cares a lot for his wife and daughter.

First appeared in Episode 154. Father of Nono. In farmers potato field, close to the Shirakaba family. A little taciturn quiet.

First appeared in Episode 154. Brother of Nono. Game lovers.

First appeared in Episode 154. Lisa's father. Close to the Daichi house. Lisa was promoted to undergo willingly accepted audition to become an idol.

 (Episode 15) → : (Episode 175)
It emerged from the first 154 episodes. Lisa's mother. Lisa was willingly accepted to be an idol.

The traduction is "hot" (あつい).

References

External links
(Official website character bios)  
(Character bios, TV Tokyo) 
(Character bios from the movie) 

Lists of anime and manga characters
Aikatsu!